The Maryville Saints are the athletic teams that represent Maryville University of St. Louis, located in Town and Country, Missouri, in NCAA Division II intercollegiate sports. The Saints compete as members of the West Division of the Great Lakes Valley Conference (GLVC) for 23 of their 24 varsity sports. The only current exception is men's volleyball, in which it competes as a de facto Division I independent. Maryville has been a full member of the GLVC since 2009 and became an active member of Division II in July 2011.

The Saints had formerly competed in the St. Louis Intercollegiate Athletic Conference, a Division III conference, since 1989 and had competed in Division III sports since 1978.

Varsity teams

List of teams
 
 
Men's sports (12) 
Baseball
Basketball
Cross country
Golf
Lacrosse
Soccer
Swimming and diving
Tennis
Track and field (indoor and outdoor)
Volleyball
Wrestling
Ice Hockey ACHA

 
Women's sports (12) 
Basketball
Bowling
Cross country
 Field hockey
Golf
Lacrosse
Soccer 
Softball
Swimming and diving
Tennis
Track and field (indoor and outdoor)
Volleyball
Ice Hockey ACHA

Individual sports

Wrestling
In 2011, Maryville added wrestling to its athletic program. Head Coach Mike Denney previously led the University of Nebraska-Omaha (UNO) to Division II dominance with seven NCAA Division II titles before the program was eliminated just before UNO's transition to Division I. With the majority of the wrestlers having transferred from the UNO program, Maryville qualified for the NCAA championship in its first season and is consistently one of the top teams in Division II, placing third at the national championships in 2014 and 2015.

Footnotes

References

External links